Dimitrij Kotschnew (born July 15, 1981) is a Kazakhstani-born German former professional ice hockey goaltender.

Kotschnew played six seasons for the Iserlohn Roosters over two spells. From 2004 to 2007, he served as their starting goaltender. He has also played in the Kontinental Hockey League. He returned to Germany in 2012, signing for the Hamburg Freezers.

Kotschnew has also played internationally for the German national team.

Personal life
Kotschnew was born in Kazakhstan, however moved to Germany when he was nine years old.  Due to his Russian German descent he also holds Russian citizenship.

References

External links

1981 births
Living people
Atlant Moscow Oblast players
Expatriate ice hockey players in Russia
Füchse Duisburg players
German ice hockey goaltenders
Kazakhstani emigrants to Germany
Hamburg Crocodiles players
Hamburg Freezers players
HC Spartak Moscow players
Iserlohn Roosters players
Lokomotiv Yaroslavl players
Nürnberg Ice Tigers players
Sportspeople from Karaganda
Russian and Soviet-German people
Soviet emigrants to Germany
Straubing Tigers players